Bernard B. Kroenke was a member of the Wisconsin State Assembly.

Biography
Kroenke was born on May 31, 1898, in Milwaukee, Wisconsin. He attended St. Francis Seminary and Marquette University. During World War I, he served in the 121st Field Artillery Regiment of the 32nd Infantry Division of the United States Army. Afterwards, Kroenke worked for the Milwaukee Railroad.

Political career
Kroenke was a member of the Assembly from 1935 to 1940. He was a Democrat.

References

Politicians from Milwaukee
Democratic Party members of the Wisconsin State Assembly
Military personnel from Milwaukee
United States Army soldiers
United States Army personnel of World War I
Marquette University alumni
St. Francis Seminary (Wisconsin) alumni
1898 births
Year of death missing